Shane Aaron Cameron (born 17 October 1977) is a New Zealand professional boxer. He is a former Commonwealth cruiserweight champion, having also held several regional titles at heavyweight. As an amateur he won a bronze medal in the heavyweight division at the 2002 Commonwealth Games. Outside of boxing, he placed fifth in the 2015 series of Dancing With the Stars New Zealand.

Amateur career 
He beat Adam Forsyth for the 2001 New Zealand heavyweight crown and lost to Jason Douglas in the semi-finals of the 91 kg Commonwealth Games, winning a bronze medal. He finished his amateur career with the record of 40 - 8.

Professional career 
Cameron made his professional debut on 28 November 2002, with a third-round knockout victory over Winston Palu in the Auckland suburb of Kohimarama. He defeated Shane Wijohn on 4 December 2004 in Auckland to win the New Zealand Heavyweight title, which he would later vacate in order to pursue international titles.
  
On 28 July 2006 in Auckland, Cameron added two more championships to his record, with a 10th-round technical knockout of Roger Izonritei. With that win, he captured the vacant WBA Pan African Heavyweight title, as well as Izonritei's International Boxing Federation(IBF) Pan Pacific title.

In October 2006, ranked 14th worldwide by the IBF, he was for the first time ranked ahead of fellow countryman and world heavyweight title contender David Tua. Cameron formally challenged Tua, declaring: "David Tua said on television a while back 'Shane who?' but if he looks at who is ranked, I am, he's not, so he knows who I am now: and if he gets in the ring with me, he will know."

In December 2006, Cameron enjoyed his 17th consecutive victory as a professional, via a 9th round TKO of South African Osborne Machimana in Christchurch, thus retaining his WBA Pan African heavyweight title.

After the fight Cameron once again called for a match with Tua. However Tua's adviser Inga Tuigamala responded: "I know Shane Cameron has been banging the drum and wants to get it on with David, but from David's perspective, Shane is still on his way up the ladder and at the moment a fight between them would be of more benefit to Shane than David."

On 7 March 2007 Cameron fought Australian boxing veteran Bob Mirovic in an Anthony Mundine undercard fight at the Sydney Entertainment Centre. Despite breaking his right hand in the first round and suffering cuts above both eyes, Cameron knocked Mirovic out in the eighth round via a left hook to the Australian's forehead to again retain his WBA Pan African title.

Once again a challenge was extended to Tua, with Cameron's camp offering the fellow Kiwi NZ$250,000 to step into the ring. After the match Cameron's New Zealand manager Ken Reinsfield stated "We'd fight Tua in a heartbeat, but you can see why Tua doesn't want to fight him."

Cameron added a third title to his collection on 28 June 2007, with a first-round TKO win over a jet-lagged Brazilian Jucimar Hipolito for the vacant World Boxing Organization Asia Pacific Heavyweight title. Jucimar was a late replacement to Kelvin Davis who broke his back after jumping off a bridge to avoid a car in a night time training run.

On 2 November 2007, Cameron suffered his first professional defeat at the hands of Friday Ahunanya. Cameron lost by a 12th round TKO decision after he was sent to the canvas twice after Ahunanya opened up bleeding cuts above Cameron's eyes. With this loss, Cameron surrendered all the titles he previously held. Cuts to both eyes hampered his vision (cut right eye in round 3, cut left eye in round 9) and ability to avoid punches from his opponent in the later rounds.  Even heading into round 12, according to commentators, he was leading on points. Cameron's management still had high hopes for his future and stated that they would allow three months for the cuts to heal properly before his next fight.

On 11 April 2008 Cameron fought American Heavyweight Jonathan Haggler, Haggler's record being 18 wins and 2 losses. Cameron knocked out Haggler in the eighth round. Winning the fight meant Cameron claimed the WBO Oriental, WBO Asia-Pacific and IBF Pan-Pacific belts. He bled only slightly from above his left eyebrow, which had been recently operated on.

Cameron then fought American Kevin Montiy on 28 June 2008 knocking him out in the 5th round.  With that win Cameron defended his IBF Pan Pacific heavyweight title and his WBO Oriental heavyweight title.  Cameron later stated "The Montiy fight was one of my best performances to date.  I had my best camp, great sparring and my conditioning was great as always".

A fight between David Tua and Shane Cameron took place in Hamilton, New Zealand on 3 October 2009. The fight was dubbed "The Fight of The Century" by promoters John McRae and David Higgins, both boxers were guaranteed $500,000 in prize money with the winner expected to get a win bonus. Despite the hype, the fight was one-sided. Tua knocked Cameron down twice in the first round, with a series of trademark left hooks. Due to an adjudicating error, Cameron was not counted out and survived to the end of the round. However, Tua exploded onto him in the first 7 seconds of the second round, backing Cameron up onto the ropes before throwing nearly 20 punches (most of which cleanly connected) to Cameron's head. As Cameron sank to the canvas, the referee stepped in to stop the fight. Losing meant Cameron surrendered his IBF Pan-Pacific, WBO Oriental and WBO Asia-Pacific belts.

Cameron defeated John Hopoate via disqualification in Melbourne, Australia, on 18 March 2010. The fight ended 43 seconds into the second round of a scheduled 10 round bout. Cameron followed up this with unanimous decision victories against Daniel Ammann and Anthony McCracken. The latter served as a final eliminator for the commonwealth cruiserweight title which Cameron fought for in his next bout against Dominic Vea. The bout took place on 20 July 2011 on the undercard of the Danny Green vs Antonio Tarver IBO cruiserweight title fight, and saw Cameron become the new commonwealth champion when he knocked out Vea in round 12.

Cameron fought Monte Barrett on 5 July 2012 for NZPBA title eliminator match (The winner would likely face Sonny Bill Williams). Three days before the fight, Cameron said his preparation for the Barrett fight had been "superb" and he was feeling good about it. He knocked out Barrett in the 4th round with an overhand right. With the win Cameron redeemed his loss to David Tua and accepted a challenge from Danny Green for the vacant IBO Cruiserweight title to be held on 21 November in Melbourne, Australia.

He lost to Danny Green by unanimous points decision in Melbourne on 21 November 2012.

Professional boxing record

Filmography

Awards and recognitions
2019 Gladrap Boxing Hall of fame
2019 Gladrap Boxing Awards Promoter of the year (Won)
2019 Gladrap Boxing Awards Trainer of the year (Nominated)
2019 Gladrap Boxing Awards Event of the year (Nominated)

References

External links
 
 Shane Cameron's profile and news
 Cameron's profile at Gary Shaw Productions
 Shane Cameron's Official Home Page

1977 births
Living people
Boxers trained by Kevin Barry
New Zealand Māori sportspeople
New Zealand professional boxing champions
Commonwealth Games bronze medallists for New Zealand
Heavyweight boxers
Boxers at the 2002 Commonwealth Games
World Boxing Organization champions
Commonwealth Boxing Council champions
New Zealand male boxers
Commonwealth Games medallists in boxing
Sportspeople from Gisborne, New Zealand
Fighters trained by Lolo Heimuli
Medallists at the 2002 Commonwealth Games